"Thank You for a Lifetime" is a 2008 pop single by Cliff Richard to coincide with the 50th anniversary of his music career. The single release reached No. 3 on the UK Singles Chart. The song is a tribute to his fans, and features the line "I gave you a lifetime, you gave me the time of my life".  It was written by Charlie Grant, Jez Ashurst and Pete Woodroffe. As of November 2022, it remains his last UK Top 10 hit.

Charts

References

2008 singles
Cliff Richard songs
Songs written by Jez Ashurst
2008 songs
Number-one singles in Scotland